Purwodadi is the name of several towns and districts in Indonesia:

Purwodadi, Grobogan, a town and district in Grobogan Regency
Purwodadi, Purworejo, a district in Purworejo Regency
Purwodadi, Musi Rawas, a district in Musi Rawas Regency